Alessa may refer to:

Alessa Gillespie, a fictional character in Silent Hill
Mohamed Mahmood Alessa, a Muslim radical captured in Operation Arabian Knight